The Subei people, also known as Jiangbei People, are a Jianghuai Mandarin-speaking Han Chinese people of the Subei region (northern Jiangsu province). 

Due to natural disasters and insurrections in their native region, during the Qing and the Republican periods, they migrated in large numbers to the Wu-speaking Jiangnan region (south of the Yangtze), especially Shanghai.  

The Subei culture was seen a symbol of sophistication during the mid-Qing dynasty period, but lost its status after China entered Railway era instead of Canal Age.

Diaspora (outside of Jiangbei)
In the Ming Dynasty and Qing dynasties, Jianghuai speakers moved and settled into Hui dialect areas.

Notable people
 Zhou Enlai
 Jiang Zemin

References

Further reading

People from Jiangsu
People from Shanghai